Nils Wahlbom (October 28, 1886 – October 24, 1937) was a Swedish film actor. He appeared in around forty films including The Women Around Larsson (1934).

Selected filmography
 The Tales of Ensign Stål (1926)
 The Devil and the Smalander (1927)
 Longing for the Sea (1931)
 Mother-in-Law's Coming (1932)
 What Do Men Know? (1933)
 Andersson's Kalle (1934)
 The Women Around Larsson (1934)
 The Atlantic Adventure (1934)
 A Wedding Night at Stjarnehov (1934)
 The Song to Her (1934)
 Kungen kommer (1936)
 Poor Millionaires (1936)
 Raggen (1936)
 Our Boy (1936)
 South of the Highway (1936)
 Adolf Strongarm (1937)
 Happy Vestköping (1937)
 Thunder and Lightning (1938)

References

Bibliography 
 Larsson, Mariah & Marklund, Anders. Swedish Film: An Introduction and Reader. Nordic Academic Press, 2010.

External links 
 

1886 births
1937 deaths
Swedish male film actors
Swedish male silent film actors
Male actors from Stockholm
20th-century Swedish male actors